The Journal of Statistics Education is a double-blind peer-reviewed scientific journal. It was established in 1992 at North Carolina State University by E. Jacquelin Dietz, and became an official publication of the American Statistical Association beginning in 1999.
It is published online three times a year, covering subjects related to statistical literacy and statistics education from elementary to college education and continuing training. The journal's audience includes teachers, educators, and researchers in statistics, probability, and science education, as well as people interested in research on statistical and probabilistic literacy.

Scope 
The journal covers curricular reform in statistics, efficacy of group learning and joint projects, innovative pedagogical techniques, case studies, general understanding of probability and statistics, statistical literacy, research on the teaching of statistics, attitudes and beliefs about statistics, the use of computers and other media in teaching, distance education, and other relevant findings. Articles that provide a scholarly overview of other publications, including books, software, data and tools are also published.

See also
 Comparison of statistics journals.

References

External links 
 
 American Statistical Association

English-language journals
Publications established in 1993
Statistics journals
Education journals
Triannual journals
Online-only journals